Little Saskatchewan First Nation is a First Nations community in the Interlake Region of central Manitoba. Its main reserve is the Little Saskatchewan 48.

It is a signatory of Treaty 2.

References 

Interlake Reserves Tribal Council
First Nations in Manitoba